Princes' Gate may refer to:

 Princes' Gates, a monumental gate at Exhibition Place, Toronto, Canada 
 the line of recessed buildings and four service roads on Kensington Road facing railings of Hyde Park in Knightsbridge, London, England, part of which is Kingston House East and North
 Princes Gate Spring Water, a Welsh brand of mineral water
 Princes Gate Towers, a now demolished set of tower blocks in Melbourne, Australia